John Le Decer (died 1332) was a fourteenth-century Mayor of Dublin, who had a notable record of charitable works and civic improvement.

He served as mayor on six occasions, in 1302, 1305, from 1307 to 1309 and in 1324. He was a man of considerable wealth, and carried out a number of noted public works "at his own expense". His most striking project was the marble cistern he built in 1308. This held Dublin's main water conduit in Cornmarket, adjacent to St. Audoen's Church in the centre of the medieval city, a work "such as was never seen here before". It was commonly called "Le Decer's Fountain", and is so described on the 1400 map of St. Audoen's Church and parish.

He built two bridges over the River Liffey: at Newbridge, County Kildare, thus giving the town its name, and at St. Wolstan's Priory, near Celbridge, County Kildare. He also built "at great expense" a bridge over the River Tolka at Ballybough, northeast of Dublin city, in 1313, but this was destroyed by floods not long afterwards. During a time of famine (possibly the Great Famine of 1315–1317), he hired three ships to go to France and buy corn, which he distributed to the poor of Dublin.

He was also generous in his support for religious houses, paying for the building of a new chapel in the Priory of Kilmainham, and for extensive works in the Monastery of Saint Francis. The Franciscan monastery, founded in 1235, was situated on present-day Francis Street in Dublin city centre, but all trace of it has vanished. It was his custom to entertain the monks of Saint Francis to dinner once a week. It was in the chapel of this monastery that he was buried in 1332.

He was married and had a daughter, Elena, who married Robert de Meones, of the prominent Anglo-Irish De Meones family who gave their name to Rathmines in south Dublin. They had at least one son, John de Meones, who also served several terms as Mayor of Dublin.

References

Notes

Sources

 
 
 
 
 
 
 

Lord Mayors of Dublin
1332 deaths
People from Dublin (city)